Events in the year 2023 in Saudi Arabia.

Incumbents

Events 
Ongoing — COVID-19 pandemic in Saudi Arabia

 January – The city of Jeddah experiences floods.
 12 March – Saudi Crown Prince Mohammed bin Salman formally announces the establishment of Riyadh Air, a new flag carrier airline of Saudi Arabia.

Sports 

 January – The 2023 Dakar Rally is held in Saudi Arabia.
 September – The 2023 World Weightlifting Championships is scheduled to be held in Riyadh, Saudi Arabia.

Deaths 

 15 January – Shaye Al-Nafisah, footballer (Al-Kawab, national team).
 12 February – Yousef Al-Salem, footballer (Al Qadsiah, Ettifaq, national team).
 28 February – Abdoh Besisi, footballer (Al Ahli, Al-Ansar, Ohod).
 6 March – Abdulrahman al-Ansary, archaeologist.
 9 March – Al Jawhara bint Abdulaziz Al Saud, royal.

See also 

 Saudi Arabia
 History of Saudi Arabia
 Outline of Saudi Arabia

References 

 
2020s in Saudi Arabia
Years of the 21st century in Saudi Arabia
Saudi Arabia
Saudi Arabia